Meggott is an English surname. Notable people with the surname include:

George Meggott (1669–1723), MP for Southwark
John Meggott (1714–1789), MP also known as John Elwes

English-language surnames